Josef Malý (25 March 1894 – 23 March 1943) was a Czech gymnast who competed for Czechoslovakia in the 1920 Summer Olympics. He was born in Prague and died in Berlin. In 1920 he was a member of the Czechoslovak gymnastic team which finished fourth in the team event.

References

1894 births
1943 deaths
Czech male artistic gymnasts
Czechoslovak male artistic gymnasts
Olympic gymnasts of Czechoslovakia
Gymnasts at the 1920 Summer Olympics
Gymnasts from Prague